The Inner Galactic Fusion Experience is the fifth studio album by guitarist Richie Kotzen, released on November 7, 1995 through Shrapnel Records.

Track listing

Personnel
Richie Kotzen – vocals, guitar, Wurlitzer, organ, drums (track 8), bass, sound effects, engineering, mixing, production
Gregg Bissonette – drums (except track 8)
Jeff Berlin – bass (tracks 1, 2, 4)
DeAnna Eve – background vocals
Jason Arnold – mastering

References

External links
In Review: Richie Kotzen "The Inner Galactic Fusion Experience" at Guitar Nine Records

Richie Kotzen albums
1995 albums
Shrapnel Records albums